The Magat River is a river in the Philippine island of Luzon with a total length of . It originates in the Nueva Vizcaya municipality of Aritao, where the Santa Fe River joins the Marang.

Tributaries
The following are the tributaries of the Magat River by length:
Alimit River – 
Matuno River – 
Ibulao River – 
Taotao River – 
Santa Cruz River – 
Padol River – 
Lamut River – 
Santa Fe River – 
Benay River – 
Marang River – 
Manga River – 
Balasig River –

Magat River Integrated Irrigation System
The Magat River Integrated Irrigation System Project, started by the National Irrigation Administration in the 1960s, is one of the Philippine's largest irrigation projects with hydroelectric power generation capacity. Its total cost amounted to US$500 million.

It is also includes hydroelectric power plants;  at Magat reservoir,  at Baligatan and  Magat mini-hydroelectric power plants in Maris main canal.

See also
 List of rivers of the Philippines

References

Rivers of the Philippines
Landforms of Isabela (province)
Landforms of Nueva Vizcaya